Road to Rio is a 1947 American semimusical comedy film directed by Norman Z. McLeod and starring Bing Crosby, Bob Hope, and Dorothy Lamour. Written by Edmund Beloin and Jack Rose, the film is about two inept vaudevillians who stow away on a Brazilian-bound ocean liner and foil a plot by a sinister hypnotist to marry off her niece to a greedy fortune hunter. Road to Rio was the fifth of the "Road to …" series.

Plot
Scat Sweeney (Crosby) and Hot Lips Barton (Hope), are two musicians, who were part of a swing quintet (the other three musicians are played by the Wiere Brothers a popular vaudeville act). Meanwhile Lucia is a glamorous nightclub singer. Scat and Hot Lips join her as her backing music: clarinet and trumpet.

They travel the United States trying to find work and stay away from girls.  After running from state to state, each time running because of a girl, they try their luck in Louisiana.

They stow away on board a Rio-bound ship, after accidentally starting some fires at a circus. They then get mixed up with the distraught Lucia, who first thanks them, then unexpectedly turns them over to the ship's captain. Unbeknownst to both of them, Lucia is being hypnotized by her crooked guardian, Catherine Vail.  Vail plans to marry Lucia to her brother so she can control her and a set of "papers".

After a series of misadventures, including sneaking off the boat, recruiting a few local musicians, and the boys trying to escape with Lucia, only to have Vail hypnotize her again and slap them both, Vail decides to do away with the boys permanently.  She hypnotizes both of them and tries to get them to kill each other in a duel, but it fails.  Scat and Hot Lips finally figure things out and the boys head for the ceremony  to stop the wedding and to help catch the crooks. Upon finding the "papers", which Scat reads, when Hot Lips asks what they are about, Scat tears them up and looks into the camera, saying, "The world must never know."

Later on, Scat is dismayed to see that Lucia loves Hot Lips and not him, but upon peeking through a keyhole, he sees Hot Lips hypnotizing her.

Hope's frequent sidekick Jerry Colonna has a cameo as the leader of a cavalry charging to the rescue of Bing and Bob, as the film cuts away to the galloping horses periodically. All is resolved before he can arrive, leading Colonna to point out:

Cast

Production and reception

Filmed from January to March 1947, the film was financed by Crosby, Hope, and Paramount. It produced $4.5 million in rental income in its initial release period in the United States and was placed sixth in the top-grossing films of 1947.  The critics liked it, with The New York Times saying in its review of February 19, 1948, inter alia: "With Bing Crosby and Bob Hope on the tramp again in Road to Rio, recklessly scattering jokes and rescuing perennial girl friend Dorothy Lamour from dangerous hypnotic trances, there's fun to be had at the Paramount. Maybe this is not the funniest picture ever made; maybe it is not even quite as rewarding as some of those earlier journeys, but there are patches in this crazy quilt that are as good and, perhaps, even better than anything the boys have done before. They are traversing more of a rollercoaster highway than usual this time and so there are some tedious uphill pulls when the huffing and puffing is excessive and the results negligible. However, when they reach the top “Road to Rio” is irresistible... All that matters really is that “Road to Rio” is fairly well loaded with laughs."
 
Variety reviewed it at a tradeshow and liked it too. "This celluloid junket along The Road to Rio should find smooth riding to sturdy box-office. The pattern established by other Paramount Road pictures is solidly followed by Daniel Dare's production to keep the laughs spilling and the paying customers satisfied."

Later reception has been more mixed. Clinical psychologist Deirdre Barrett emphasizes the hyper-(un)realistic use of verbal hypnotic induction as a central plot device in Road to Rio as part of her analysis of mid-20th-century tropes and stereotypes of hypnosis in popular culture.

The film was preserved by the UCLA Film & Television Archive.

Soundtrack

"Apalachicola, Fla" (Jimmy Van Heusen / Johnny Burke) including a few lines from Swanee River and Carry Me Back to Old Virginny, sung by Bing Crosby and Bob Hope.
"But Beautiful" (Jimmy Van Heusen / Johnny Burke), sung by Bing Crosby
"You Don't Have to Know the Language" (Jimmy Van Heusen / Johnny Burke): sung by Bing Crosby and the Andrews Sisters
"Experience" (Jimmy Van Heusen / Johnny Burke), sung by Dorothy Lamour
"Batuque No Morro" (Russo do Pandeiro / Sá Róris): sung by chorus, with parody lines by Bing Crosby and Bob Hope

Another song, "For What?" by Burke and Van Heusen, was written for the film, but dropped from the released print.

Bing Crosby recorded four of the songs for Decca Records and these were also issued on a 78 rpm album titled "Selections from Road to Rio". “But Beautiful” and "You Don't Have to Know the Language" made fleeting appearances in the Billboard charts. Crosby's songs were also included in the Bing's Hollywood series.

References

External links

 
 
 
 
 Australian daybill long poster

1947 films
1940s adventure comedy films
1947 romantic comedy films
1947 musical comedy films
American adventure comedy films
American black-and-white films
American buddy comedy films
American musical comedy films
American comedy road movies
American romantic comedy films
American romantic musical films
1940s buddy comedy films
Road to ... (film series)
Films directed by Norman Z. McLeod
Films scored by Robert Emmett Dolan
Films set in Rio de Janeiro (city)
Films about hypnosis
Paramount Pictures films
Self-reflexive films
1940s American films